Mitchelli may refer to:

 D. mitchellii
 Diplodactylus mitchelli, a gecko species in the genus Diplodactylus
 E. mitchelli
 Enaliarctos mitchelli, an extinct pinniped species in the genus  Enaliarctos
 M. mitchelli
 Modisimus mitchelli, Gertsch, 1971, a spider species Modisimus and the family Pholcidae found in Mexico
 O. mitchelli
 Oonops mitchelli, Gertsch, 1977, a spider species in the genus Oonops found in Mexico
 S. mitchelli
 Sabacon mitchelli, a  harvestman species in the genus Sabacon
 T. mitchelli
 Tipula mitchelli, Edwards, 1927, a crane fly species in the genus Tipula

Subspecies 
 Dipodomys merriami mitchelli, a subspecies in the species Dipodomys merriami, the Merriam's kangaroo rat,a rodent species
 Pogona minor mitchelli, a subspecies in the agamid lizard species Pogona minor found in Western Australia

See also 
 Mitchell (disambiguation)

External links